The 1961 Swedish speedway season was the 1961 season of motorcycle speedway in Sweden.

Individual

Individual Championship
The 1961 Swedish Individual Speedway Championship final was held on 22 September in Stockholm. Björn Knutsson won the Swedish Championship.

Swedish Junior Championship
 
Winner - Willihard Thomsson

Team

Team Championship
Vargarna won division 1 and were declared the winners of the Swedish Speedway Team Championship for the sixth time.

The Vargarna team contained Björn Knutsson, Joel Jansson, Sören Sjösten and Per-Tage Svensson.

With 14 teams lining up for the 1961 season the second division was split into a north and south competition. Folkare won the second division north and Kaparna B won the second division south. Älgarna changed their name to Gävle.

See also 
 Speedway in Sweden

References

Speedway leagues
Professional sports leagues in Sweden
Swedish
Seasons in Swedish speedway